Cyperus pulcherrimus is a species of sedge that is native to tropical parts of Asia.

See also 
 List of Cyperus species

References 

pulcherrimus
Plants described in 1837
Flora of India
Flora of Bangladesh
Flora of Borneo
Flora of Cambodia
Flora of Indonesia
Flora of Malaysia
Flora of New Guinea
Flora of the Philippines
Flora of Sri Lanka
Flora of Thailand
Flora of Vietnam
Flora of the Nicobar Islands
Taxa named by Carl Sigismund Kunth